Karel Michlowsky (9 October 1918 – 11 December 1998) was a Czech footballer and football manager. He played for SK Bata Zlin, FC Sochaux-Montbéliard, Angers SCO and AS Saint-Étienne. After his playing career he became a coach in France. Michlowsky died in December 1998 at the age of 80.

References

External links
 

1918 births
1998 deaths
Angers SCO managers
Angers SCO players
AS Saint-Étienne players
Association football forwards
Czech football managers
Czech expatriate football managers
Czech footballers
Czechoslovak expatriate footballers
Czechoslovak expatriate sportspeople in France
Czechoslovak football managers
Czechoslovak footballers
Expatriate football managers in France
Expatriate footballers in France
FC Nantes managers
FC Sochaux-Montbéliard players
Ligue 1 players
Ligue 2 players
RC Lens managers
People from Břeclav District
Sportspeople from the South Moravian Region